Modesto Soruco Saucedo (born February 12, 1966) is a retired Bolivian football defender who played for the Bolivia national team in Copa América 1991 and Copa América 1993. He was also a member of the squad that qualified and participated in the 1994 FIFA World Cup. At club level he spent most of his career with Blooming, where he played from 1986 to 1997. Towards the end of his career, Soruco also had spells with San José, Independiente Petrolero and Aurora. He made his final run in the Copa Simón Bolívar with Real Santa Cruz in 2003.

References
playerhistory

1966 births
Living people
1991 Copa América players
1993 Copa América players
1994 FIFA World Cup players
Association football defenders
Bolivian footballers
Bolivia international footballers
Club Aurora players
Club Blooming players
Club San José players
People from José Miguel de Velasco Province